Andrew Comrie-Picard (born ) is a Canadian race car driver, X Games athlete, stuntman, and TV personality. In 2003, he left his career as a young New York City entertainment lawyer to pursue a career in race driving. He has since won international and American championships, hosted and produced internationally distributed automotive TV shows (including Hyperdrive, Battlecross, Car Saviors, Fastest Car, and Top Gear USA), and designed, coordinated, and driven stunts in feature film and television.

Early life and education 
Comrie-Picard grew up on a small farm in Alberta, Canada. At an early age, he was interested in stunt driving, spending his childhood driving on dirt roads and fields.

Comrie-Picard holds five university degrees: an M.A. from Trinity College, Oxford, a B.A. from The University of Trinity College (University of Toronto), and an MBA and LL.B. (law) degree from McGill University.

In 1992, he was appointed the Scribe, or head, of the secretive Episkopon society at Trinity College, Toronto. He took the society underground by disassociating with the college after the administration demanded that Episkopon develop a constitution which he refused. He told the Canadian national Globe and Mail newspaper, "It's satire, humour. It doesn't need a constitution, and it doesn't need to be approved."

Racing career 
Comrie-Picard has competed at the top levels of Pro Rally Racing (driving for Mitsubishi, Toyota, and Ford), Pro Drifting (Dodge Viper), desert off-road racing (two-time Baja1000 class winner), Short Course off-road, Hillclimb (Pikes Peak International Hillclimb record-holder), and Endurance circuit racing. 

He is a 5-time X Games athlete in Rally Car Racing and Rallycross. At X Games 16, he won the bronze medal in Rally Car Racing. He won the 2009 North American Rally Cup championship in a Mitsubishi Lancer Evolution IX and, in 2014, the John Woodner Cup for First Overall in the American 2WD Championship. He is one of the four drivers (with Tanner Foust, Travis Pastrana, and Ken Block) to compete at the first five X Games where Rally Car Racing was featured: X Games 12 (2006), X Games 13 (2007), X Games 14 (2008), X Games 15 (2009), and X Games 16 (2010).

He won at the 2006 Sno*Drift Rally in Michigan,[5] 2007 Rallye Perce-Neige in Quebec,2009 Rally Colorado, 2010 Oregon Trail Rally. He also won the Targa Newfoundland road rally in the competition debut of the Mitsubishi Lancer Evolution X (2008) and again in 2012. In 2010 at Pikes Peak, he crashed at Engineer's Corner. In 2011, after several seasons of rallying in the top-level AWD category, he returned to rally competition in the 2WD category, campaigning for a manufacturer-backed 2011 Scion xD in selected Rally America events. He also drove a Mark IV Toyota Supra to second place in the Modern division at Targa Newfoundland after coming in sixth in the same car in 2010. He competed in the Baja 1000 desert race in 2011 and 2013 in a Class 10 Baja Challenge buggy for BFGoodrich; he and his team won the class in 2013. In 2012 and 2013, he continued to drive for Scion in Rally America competition, finishing 2nd in the 2WD category championship in both seasons. He also competed in the 2012 and 2013 Pikes Peak International Hillclimb with a version of the Scion xD. Coming off the successful 3-year development program with the Scion Rally Team, in January 2014, "ACP" moved over to Ford Racing and Team O'Neil, driving a Ford Fiesta ST developed by Team O'Neil and M-Sport to compete for the 2014 Rally America 2WD Championship. In July 2014, he secured the 2014 Rally America 2WD Championship with two events remaining, and in the 2014 season took five firsts, two seconds, and a third. He also secured seventeen consecutive podiums from 2012–2014, and for only the second time in a decade of Rally America history, put a 2wd car on the overall national podium. In July 2017, Andrew Comrie-Picard returned to rally competition in the American Rally Association series New England Forest Rally for the gravel rally debut of the Ford Focus RS developed by Team O'Neil. The new car, which had competed for the first time at the Mount Washington Hill Climb, placed first in Production4WD class and fourth overall.

Stunts 
Comrie-Picard was a consulting producer and stunt coordinator in several seasons of Top Gear USA on the History Channel and appeared as a stunt driver in recent Tyler Perry, Arnold Schwarzenegger, Charlize Theron, Deadpool, and Fast and Furious films. He designed and tested an extreme stunt course for NetflixHyperdrive, and coached competitors worldwide in their attempts to complete it for television. He has coordinated stunts for Fastest Car (Netflix) and has performed stunts in several commercials and television shows, including NCIS New Orleans, for which he doubled Scott Bakula.

In television 
His acting and television hosting centres around automobiles. He has co-hosted the Canadian Rally Championship on the CHUM and A-Channel networks, Targa Newfoundland on SpeedTV and Rogers Cable, hosted the reality show "War of the Wheels" on Global, was an "extreme auto" correspondent for The New Drivers' Seat TV on CHUM and A-Channel. He co-hosted a show for the Discovery Channel called "Ultimate Car Buildoff" with car designer Chip Foose and fabricator Lou Santiago. In 2011, Comrie-Picard hosted a special called BattleXross on SpeedTV in which he set up a stunt course for two top extreme drivers to compete on. In 2013 he hosted a series of Yahoo! Autos videos; in 2014, he hosted a GranTurismo launch segment. He has hosted Ford's Truth About Trucks video series from 2014–2021. In 2017, his auto build/stunt show "Car Saviors" aired on Discovery Channel; the pilot episode saw Comrie-Picard drift a 1977 Rolls-Royce Silver Shadow that he and his co-host Brian Scotto had fitted with a new Mopar Hemi engine with other performance upgrades.

Personal life 
He is a member of the international GoodGear expedition that will attempt to circumnavigate the globe with wheeled and amphibious vehicles without leaving the Earth's surface, passing through both poles, starting in 2022. The expedition aims to promote and utilize positive new technologies to advance the understanding and to contribute to the dataset for responsible management of the planet.

Comrie-Picard lives in Los Angeles with his wife and two daughters.

Canadian Rally Championship Results
He currently ranks 21st in lifetime points, with 1340pts.

Complete Rally America results

References

External links

 Official website

Canadian television sportscasters
Canadian rally drivers
Canadian lawyers
Alumni of Trinity College, Oxford
Trinity College (Canada) alumni
1971 births
Living people